The Zhenyuan Miaodao Yaolue  (真元妙道要略, lit. Essentials of the Mysterious Way of the True Origin) is a Taoist alchemy text that dates to c. 950. It contains one of the earliest known references to gunpowder.

Dating and authorship 
The text is attributed to Zheng Yin, an alchemist from the 3rd century who purportedly taught Ge Hong, but the bulk of the text appears to have been written during the 9th century.

Contents 
The document compiles thirty-four recipes of elixirs that potentially could cause harm. Of these, three recipes mention saltpeter as an ingredient. A warning is given regarding a particularly dangerous combination of materials:

The ingredients would have produced a weak form of gunpowder—a mixture of sulphur, saltpeter, and carbon—with honey acting as the source of carbon.

References

Citations

Bibliography
 

Gunpowder
Chinese alchemy
Taoist texts